Thaalibia Quran is a mushaf written in Algeria.

Thaalibia may also refer to:

Thaalibia Publishing, an Algerian publishing house
Thaalibia Cemetery, in the Casbah of Algiers, Algeria
Madrasa Thaalibia, in Algiers, Algeria
Zawiya Thaalibia (Algiers), in the Casbah of Algiers, Algeria
Zawiya Thaalibia (Issers), in the Issers, Algeria

See also
Tha'alibi (surname)